Streptomyces yatensis is a bacterium species from the genus of Streptomyces which has been isolated from ultramafic soil in New Caledonia.

See also 
 List of Streptomyces species

References

Further reading

External links
Type strain of Streptomyces yatensis at BacDive – the Bacterial Diversity Metadatabase

yatensis
Bacteria described in 2003